Modest Romiszewski (29 July 1861, in Warsaw – 7 October 1930, in Warsaw) was a Polish general, son of Imperial Russian Army general Władysław Romiszewski and Anna Dżakeli. Reached the rank of general in 1913. Since 29 December 1918 general in the Polish Army (Wojsko Polskie). A military theorist, transferred to reserve on 6 May 1921. He is buried at Powązki Cemetery in Warsaw. Married, had 4 children.

1861 births
1930 deaths
Polish generals
Burials at Powązki Cemetery
Imperial Russian Army generals
Polish generals in the Imperial Russian Army
Georgian emigrants to Poland